Angelika Kahl, née Handt (born 10 July 1954 in Radebeul, Bezirk Dresden) is a retired East German sprinter who specialized in the 400 metres.

She won a gold medal in 4x400 metres relay at the 1974 European Championships, together with teammates Waltraud Dietsch, Ellen Streidt and Brigitte Rohde. She finished fifth in the individual event at the same European Championships, as well as fourth at the 1974 European Indoor Championships.

She competed for the club SC Einheit Dresden during her active career.

References

1954 births
Living people
People from Radebeul
People from Bezirk Dresden
East German female sprinters
Sportspeople from Saxony
Dresdner SC athletes
European Athletics Championships medalists
Recipients of the Patriotic Order of Merit in bronze